The Fântânele Power Station is a large thermal power plant located in Mureș County having 5 generation groups of 50 MW having a total electricity generation capacity of 250 MW.

References

External links
http://www.elcen.ro/ Official site 

Natural gas-fired power stations in Romania